Suvi Do (Serbo-Croatian for "Dry valley") may refer to:
Suvi Do (Blace), a village in the municipality of Blace, Serbia
Suvi Do (Niš), a village in the city of Niš, Serbia
Suvi Do (Tutin), a village in the municipality of Tutin, Serbia
Suvi Do (Žagubica), a village in the municipality of Žagubica, Serbia
,  a village in the municipality of Lipljan, Kosovo
,  a village in the municipality of Mitrovica, Kosovo

or:
, a village in the municipality of Zvečan, Kosovo
Donji Suvi Do, a village in the municipality of Mitrovica, Kosovo
Gornji Suvi Do, a village in the municipality of Mitrovica, Kosovo

See also
Suvi Dol, a village in the city of Vranje, Serbia
Suhi Dol (disambiguation)